The 2003 Wirral Metropolitan Borough Council election took place on 1 May 2003 to elect members of Wirral Metropolitan Borough Council in England. This election was held on the same day as other local elections.

After the election, the composition of the council was:

Election results

Overall election result
Overall result compared with 2002.

Ward results
Results compared directly with the last local election in 2002.

Bebington

Bidston

Birkenhead

Bromborough

Clatterbridge

Claughton

Eastham

Egerton

Heswall

Hoylake

Leasowe

Liscard

Moreton

New Brighton

Oxton

Prenton

Royden

Seacombe

Thurstaston

Tranmere

Upton

Wallasey

Notes

• italics denote the sitting councillor • bold denotes the winning candidate

References 

2003 English local elections
2003
2000s in Merseyside